Jamie Hodgson (born 19 March 1998) is a Scotland international rugby union player. He plays for Edinburgh Rugby in the United Rugby Championship. Hodgson's primary position is lock.

Rugby Union career

Professional career

Hodgson made his debut for Edinburgh on 26 October 2018.

International career

In June 2021 Hodgson was called up to the Scotland squad for the Summer internationals.

He made his Scotland debut against Tonga on 30 October 2021. Scotland won the match 60-14.

References

External links
 
profile at Edinburgh Rugby

1998 births
Living people
Edinburgh Rugby players
Rugby union locks
Rugby union players from Livingston, West Lothian
Scotland international rugby union players
Scottish rugby union players